"Say Hello" is a song by American electronic music duo Deep Dish. It was originally included on the group's 2005 album, George Is On, and was released as a single on July 4, 2005. The song's vocals were provided by Anousheh Khalili.

"Say Hello" became another popular hit for the group, topping the US Billboard Hot Dance Club Play chart and peaking at number 14 on the UK Singles Chart. In Finland, it reached number four to become the band's first of three top-10 singles. It was nominated for a Grammy Award in the category Best Dance Recording at the 2006 ceremony, losing out to "Galvanize" by the Chemical Brothers.

Charts

Weekly charts

Year-end charts

Release history

See also
 List of UK Dance Chart number-one singles of 2005
 Number-one dance hits of 2005 (USA)

References

2005 singles
2005 songs
Deep Dish (band) songs
Positiva Records singles
Sony Music Australia singles